Leptochidium is a genus of lichen-forming fungi in the family Massalongiaceae. It has two species:
Leptochidium albociliatum 
Leptochidium crenatulum 

The genus was circumscribed by French lichenologist Maurice Choisy in 1952. Leptochidium remained monotypic until 2006, when Per Magnus Jørgensen transferred into it a species originally named Leptogium rivulare var. crenatulum by William Nylander.

References

Peltigerales
Lichen genera
Peltigerales genera
Taxa named by Maurice Choisy
Taxa described in 1952